Hierodula unimaculata is an Asian praying mantis species in the tribe Paramantini.

References

External links 

unimaculata
Mantodea of Asia
Insects of Vietnam